Semialarium is a genus of flowering plants belonging to the family Celastraceae.

Its native range is Mexico to Southern Tropical America.

Species:

Semialarium mexicanum 
Semialarium paniculatum

References

Celastraceae
Celastrales genera